Itea (before 1926: Βύρμπενη - Vyrmpeni; ;  or ), is a village and a community of the Florina municipality. Before the 2011 local government reform it was a part of the municipality of Meliti, of which it was a municipal district. The 2011 census recorded 542 residents in the village. The community of Itea covers an area of 9.799 km2.

History
In 1845 the Russian slavist Victor Grigorovich recorded Verbini as Bulgarian village. Johann Georg von Hahn in his map from 1861 marked the village as Bulgarian, too.

In the book “Ethnographie des Vilayets d'Adrianople, de Monastir et de Salonique”, published in Constantinople in 1878, that reflects the statistics of the male population in 1873, Dolno Vrbeni was noted as a village with 200 households and 615 Bulgarian inhabitants. In 1886 al of its inhabitants were Greek Orthodox. In 1900 there was a Bulgarian school and church. According to Vasil Kanchov’s statistics, in 1900, Varbeni had 690 Bulgarian inhabitants. In 1903 all of its inhabitants were part of the Bulgarian Exarchate. The whole population of the village was under the supremacy of the Bulgarian Exarchate in the early 20th century. According to the evidences of Dimitar Mishev, the secretary of the Exarchate, there were 624 Bulgarians in Varbeni in 1905. In 1910 Vyrbeni had 455 inhabitants. In 1925, 50 inhabitants of the village were arrested by Greek authorities for collaborating with VMRO in the November bombing incident in Florina.

Demographics
Itea had 713 inhabitants in 1981. In fieldwork done by Riki Van Boeschoten in late 1993, Itea was populated by Slavophones. The Macedonian language was spoken by people over 60, mainly in private. 

According to the 2011 census, the population of Itea was 542 people, a decrease of 14% compared to the previous census of 2001.

Notable persons 
 Liolias, Greek Macedonian fighter and local chieftain
 Georgi Traykov (1898–1975) - Bulgarian politician. Leader of BANU from 1947 and 1975 and head of state of Bulgaria from 1964 to 1971.

References

Populated places in Florina (regional unit)